Ilonka may refer to:

 Lovely Ilonka, Hungarian fairy tale
 Ilonka Elmont (b. 1974), Dutch-Surinamese kickboxer
 Ilonka, a character in the 1944 film House of Frankenstein

See also
 Ilona, Hungarian given name
 Elonka (disambiguation)
 Ilonika, Americanized version of Hungarian Ilonka